Lars Winter (born 13 May 1962) is a Finnish fencer. He competed in the individual épée event at the 1988 Summer Olympics.

References

External links
 

1962 births
Living people
Finnish male épée fencers
Olympic fencers of Finland
Fencers at the 1988 Summer Olympics
People from Lappeenranta
Sportspeople from South Karelia